Mehmet Naci Bostancı (born 2 August 1957) is a Turkish politician and academic who currently serves as the Deputy Speaker of the Grand National Assembly along with Şafak Pavey, Koray Aydın and Yurdusev Özsökmenler as of 9 July 2015. He was formerly one of the five parliamentary group leaders of the Justice and Development Party (AKP), having served as an AKP Member of Parliament for the electoral district of Amasya since the 2011 Turkish general election.

Early life and career
Mehmet Naci Bostancı was born in Amasya on 2 August 1957 and graduated from Ankara University Faculty of Political Science in 1980. He did a Master's degree and a Doctorate at Istanbul University Institute of Social Sciences. He worked as a columnist for the Türkiye Günlüğü and Birikim magazines as well as the Zaman newspaper.

Academic career
Bostancı became the chief advisor to the Rector of Gazi University, Rıza Ayhan and later became the head of the Public Relations and Presentation branch of Gazi University's Faculty of Communications, serving between 1998 and 2004. On 11 March 2009, he became the Dean of the Gazi University Faculty of Communications, serving until 10 March 2011. He resigned from his position to contest the upcoming 2011 general election.

Political career
Bostancı had previously served as the political advisor to the former leader of the Motherland Party (ANAP), Mesut Yılmaz. Between 1989 and 1991, he was the Undersecretary to the Ministry of Culture and Tourism. He was the President and later the Secretary General of the Turkey-Kyrgyzstan interparliamentary friendship group. He was also a member of the Turkey-Ireland interparliamentary friendship group. On 8 January 2014, he became the President of the Parliamentary Commission on National Education, Culture, Youth and Sports. With serving parliamentary group leader Nurettin Canikli becoming the Minister of Customs and Trade in the Government of Ahmet Davutoğlu, Bostancı was elected in his place with 263 out of 265 votes (with 2 blank votes).

He was re-elected from Amasya in the June 2015 general election and was selected as the AKP Deputy Speaker of the Grand National Assembly on 9 July 2015.

See also
İsmet Yılmaz
Ahmet Aydın

References

External links
Profile at the Parliament website
Collection of all relevant news items at Haberler.com

Ankara University Faculty of Political Sciences alumni
Members of the 24th Parliament of Turkey
Members of the 25th Parliament of Turkey
Justice and Development Party (Turkey) politicians
Motherland Party (Turkey) politicians
Academic staff of Gazi University
1957 births
People from Amasya
Living people
Deputies of Amasya
Deputy Speakers of the Grand National Assembly of Turkey
Members of the 26th Parliament of Turkey